Church Hill is an unincorporated community in Rusk County, located in the U.S. state of Texas. According to the Handbook of Texas, the community had a population of 20 in 2000. It is located within the Longview, Texas metropolitan area.

History
The area in what is known as Church Hill today was first settled in the early 1850s by people from Georgia. It was named for a hill covered in trees where they built a church. Plantations were soon built. A man named Dr. Prior built the first brick house in the community after moving to the area from Virginia. A post office was established at Church Hill in 1893 and remained in operation until 1904 with George S. Strong as postmaster. Mail was then sent from Henderson. The community had a population of 30 in 1895 alongside a Methodist church and a general store. Its population was still 30 from 1936-1966, lost half of it from 1967-1990, and went up to 20 in 2000. Strong cemetery is located nearby.

Geography

Education
Church Hill had a school called Church Hill Male and Female Academy in the 1850s and was supported by a Presbyterian church. John C. Robertson, Samuel Watson, and Strong donated land for the school. Jackson Pryor, Anderson W. Smith, Newell Tullis, and William P. Wright served as trustees on the school board. The principal was John M. Becton. It closed sometime after the American Civil War. Today, the community is served by the Henderson Independent School District.

Notes

Unincorporated communities in Cherokee County, Texas
Unincorporated communities in Texas